The siege of Port-au-Prince was an engagement that took place during the Haitian Revolution.

Siege 
In October, the rebel army commanded by General Dessalines, a force of 22,000 men, laid siege to the city of Port-au-Prince. After a month of siege and several attacks, the French troops commanded by Lavalette evacuate the place and retreat to the Cap-Français.

Notes

Bibliography 
 
 

Conflicts in 1803
Port-au-Prince 1803
Port-au-Prince 1803
Haitian Revolution
1803 in France
1803 in the Caribbean
October 1803 events
History of Port-au-Prince